Jonathan Edward James Bacon is a writer and software engineer, originally from the United Kingdom, but now based in California. He works as a consultant on community strategy.

History 
Bacon started his work with the Linux community when he created the Linux UK website. When he left this project he moved on to join the KDE team, where he created the KDE::Enterprise website and KDE Usability Study, before shifting his attention to GNOME

Bacon started his career as a Linux journalist before moving on, in 2006, to work for OpenAdvantage, to help move organizations to Open Source solutions. From 4 September 2006, until 28 May 2014, he worked for Canonical Ltd. as the Ubuntu Community Manager. From 29 May 2014, until 30 October 2015, he worked at XPrize as the Senior Director of Community. From 14 November 2015, to May 2016, Bacon worked as Director of Community for GitHub. He currently works as a consultant on community strategy.

Journalism 
Bacon has written for a variety of publications, including Linux User and Developer, Linux Format, Linux Magazine, MacTech, MacFormat and PC Plus. In addition to these magazines, he has also written a number of books, including "The Art of Community", "Linux Desktop Hacks", "PHP and MySQL Web Applications: Building Eight Dynamic Web Sites" and he also co-wrote "The Official Ubuntu Book" with Benjamin Mako Hill, Corey Burger, and Jonathan Jesse.

Bacon was the co-founder of the LugRadio and Bad Voltage podcasts and was a co-host on FLOSS Weekly.

Music 
Bacon played in several metal bands as singer and guitarist. From 2008 to 2012, he and Defiance guitarist Jim Adams ran the metal band Severed Fifth, which released three albums and distributed its music freely under a Creative Commons license.

Bibliography

References

External links 

 Jono Bacon's website and blog

1979 births
Free software programmers
Living people
Musicians from the West Midlands (county)
Ubuntu (operating system) people